Bae Hu-min (born February 13, 1991) is a South Korean football player.

Playing career
Bae Hu-min played for Yokohama FC in 2013 season. In 2014, he moved to Azul Claro Numazu. In 2015, he back to Yokohama FC.

References

External links

1991 births
Living people
South Korean footballers
J2 League players
Japan Football League players
Yokohama FC players
Azul Claro Numazu players
Association football midfielders